Life in a... Metro is a 2007 Indian Hindi-language drama film co-produced, co-written and directed by Anurag Basu. Partly inspired from Billy Wilder's romantic comedy film The Apartment (1960), it features an ensemble cast of Dharmendra, Nafisa Ali, Shilpa Shetty, Kay Kay Menon, Shiney Ahuja, Irrfan Khan, Konkona Sen Sharma, Kangana Ranaut and Sharman Joshi in lead roles. The music is composed by Pritam with lyrics by Sayeed Quadri. It narrates the lives of nine people living in Mumbai and deals with topics such as extramarital affairs, sanctity of marriage, commitment phobia and love.

Made on a budget of 70 million, Life in a... Metro released on 11 May 2007 and was a surprise commercial success at the box office, grossing over 250 million worldwide. It received widespread critical acclaim upon release, with praise for its story, screenplay, dialogues, soundtrack, cinematography and performances of the ensemble cast.

At the 53rd Filmfare Awards, Life in a... Metro received 6 nominations, including Best Director (Basu) and Best Music Director (Pritam), and won 3 awards – Best Supporting Actor (Khan), Best Supporting Actress (Sen Sharma) and Best Screenplay (Basu).

Character description
The movie revolves around 9 characters who are connected by the people they know. It shows how they learn the true meaning of love, go through heartbreaks, and go along the path of life.

Amol
Amol (Dharmendra) is Shivani's (Nafisa Ali) old lover who left her to pursue his dreams in the US 40 years ago. Now, he is in his 70s and is waiting for death. His last wish is to spend his last days with Shivani in India. Shivani is also counting her last days.

Shivani
Shivani is Shikha (Shilpa Shetty) and Shruti's (Konkona Sen Sharma) aunt, who at the start of the film, receives a letter from the US, which Shikha reads out. The letter turns out to be from her old lover Amol (Dharmendra), who left her for the US 40 years ago. He conveys in the letter that he is coming to India probably for the last time before dying and he wishes to meet Shivani for the last time.

Shikha Ghosh Kapoor
Shikha Ghosh Kapoor, Shruti's (Konkona Sen Sharma) sister, often visits her aunt, Shivani (Nafisa Ali) at her old-age home and Bharatanatyam classes. Her marriage to Ranjit (Kay Kay Menon) is crumbling. One day, she happens to meet Akash (Shiney Ahuja), a drama actor, whose friends often practice drama in the building of Shivani's old-age home and whose dramas Shivani often hears and likes. Shikha and Akash start talking to each other as friends, and slowly start getting close to each other romantically.

Ranjit Kapoor
In his 30's, Ranjit Kapoor (Kay Kay Menon) is married to Shikha Ghosh (Shilpa Shetty), Shruti's (Konkona Sen Sharma) sister. They have an 8-year-old daughter. They are in an unhappy marriage as he does not allow Shikha to work, since he believes he earns more than enough for the house. Due to his unhappy marriage, he started an illegitimate relationship with Neha (Kangana Ranaut) for pleasure, not love, which no one knows about for the past 2 years

Akash Sharma
Akash Sharma (Shiney Ahuja) is an unsuccessful theatre artist who forms a close bond with Shikha (Shilpa Shetty). He conveys to her that his wife left him due to his professional failure and that he plans to look for jobs in Dubai. They form a close bond and start visiting restaurants and theatres together, both developing mutual attraction.

Monty
Monty (Irrfan Khan), who is in his late-30s, is also eager to get married. He meets up with Shruti (Konkona Sen Sharma) one day as a prospective groom. Shruti misunderstands that Monty is a complete flirt during their meeting, and their meeting does not end well, though Monty completely respects Shruti. The two later meet again after Shruti has broken up with her boss (Ashwin Mushran). They start spending time together as friends and eventually develop feelings for each other.

Shruti Ghosh
Shruti (Konkona Sen Sharma), Shikha's sister and Neha's (Kangana Ranaut) roommate, is 27 years old and is very eager to get married. She meets many prospective grooms, in which one of them is Monty (Irrfan Khan), who Shruti finds very weird and old. Shruti silently crushes on her boss (Ashwin Mushran), who helps her find boyfriends.

Neha
Neha (Kangana Ranaut), who is also eager to move up the ranks, starts an illegitimate relationship with Ranjit (Kay Kay Menon). She and Ranjit often visit Rahul's (Sharman Joshi) house after Ranjit indirectly threatens Rahul by exposing what he does for recommendation, unless he lends his apartment to him. Rahul agrees, but he does not know that Ranjit's girlfriend is Neha. Neha feels slightly guilty about her affair, and indirectly conveys her feelings to her roommate, Shruti (Konkona Sen Sharma), who is the sister of Ranjit's wife Shikha (Shilpa Shetty).

Rahul
Rahul (Sharman Joshi) is a young man who works at a call centre and wants to raise up high in the ranks. He silently loves his colleague, Neha (Kangana Ranaut), who has moved up high in the ranks due to her illegitimate relationship with their boss Ranjit (Kay Kay Menon). Rahul, eager to move up the ranks, lends his apartment to people in touch with Ranjit by allowing them to bring their girlfriends and paramours in turn for recommendation.

Plot
The story takes place in Mumbai.

Rahul, who is eager to move up the ranks in his call center job, lends his apartment to people connected to his boss, Ranjit, for bringing their girlfriends and affair interests in turn for recommendation. He silently loves Neha, his colleague, who has risen up in the ranks easily due to her relationship with Ranjit.

Ranjit is very unhappy with his marriage with his wife Shikha (he has an eight-year-old daughter), so he started an illegitimate relationship with Neha. The only problem is that he doesn't have any place to take her to. When he hears about what Rahul does, he calls him to his office and says that he will expose what Rahul does in his apartment unless he lends it to him. Rahul agrees and Ranjit promotes him. Unfortunately, he does not know that Ranjit's affair interest is Neha.

Shikha, who often meets her aunt in her Bharatanatyam classes, reads out a letter from the US for her aunt. She learns through the letter that her aunt, Shivani, had loved a man named Amol forty years ago, but he left her to pursue his dreams in the US. Now Amol and Shivani, who are both in their seventies, are counting their last days. Amol conveys through the letter that he is probably coming to India for the last time and wishes to meet Shivani and spend his last days with her. Shivani agrees.

Shikha's sister, Shruti, is twenty-seven and very eager to get married and meets many prospective grooms. Among them is Monty, who Shruti finds very weird and old. Shruti is also Neha's roommate and Neha often indirectly conveys her guilty feelings of starting an affair with Ranjit, which Shruti does not understand.

Shikha accompanies her aunt to the railway station where Shivani is asked by Amol to meet her. While Shikha is away to buy magazines, Shivani sees Amol in the opposite platform. Instead of coming through the walk path, he gets down onto the tracks and crosses them to the other platform to meet her. This is watched by Shikha, who feels happy seeing the scene.

One day, Shikha meets Akash, an unsuccessful theatre artist and a divorcee at a bus stop. He practices drama with his friends in the floor above Shivani's Bharatanatyam classes.  They start off as friends, but slowly start getting close and visit places non-romantically.

Shruti has a crush on her boss, who often tries to set her up with men for her to go out with, but the idea fails. One day, Shruti visits her boss's home to convey her feelings, but is shocked when she discovers her boss in bed with another man, showing that he is gay. Shruti immediately quits her job and enrolls in a new company. There, she discovers that Monty also works there. Monty helps her get the job with his relations with his boss and they become friends. Monty also conveys that his mother has found an ideal bride for him, and asks Shruti's help with the wedding shopping. After the wedding shopping, they sit on a seashore and drink and smoke. When Shruti confronts him, he says that he will quit if his wife wants him to after marriage and respect whatever his wife says. Shruti, moved by this statement, slowly starts falling for Monty.

During one of Ranjit and Neha's trips in Rahul's house, Neha forgets her phone. Rahul finds it in his house and gives it to Ranjit, who in turn asks someone to give it to Neha. Rahul, who witnesses this, realizes that Ranjit's girlfriend is Neha and gets heartbroken.

Amol and Shivani, who have rekindled their love, attempt to get Shivani out of the old-age home. But the youngster who manages the old-age home insults Amol and Shivani, giving them a heartbreak.

During another trip in Rahul's house, Neha asks Ranjit about their future, at which point Ranjit says that they are doing it only for pleasure, and says that Neha has used him for promotions. When Neha retaliates by saying that she was the one being used, Ranjit insults her and says that she hasn't only asked him for money, which he throws on Neha. Neha, upset, attempts suicide by drinking phenyl.

Rahul, who is upset, brings home a prostitute. When he enters the bathroom to fetch a condom, he finds Neha who has attempted suicide. He immediately drives out the prostitute and calls his neighbor who is a doctor; they are able to save Neha by making her vomit and admit her in a hospital. Rahul calls up Ranjit, who has left for Bangalore due to an urgent business, who tells him to take care of Neha for a few days. Shruti realizes that Neha hasn't come home.

One night, Amol visits Shivani, who asks him to spend the night with him, which he does. In the morning, Shivani wakes up and experiences some pains, at which point Amol calls for an ambulance. Realizing that she is going to die, Shivani says that her last wish is to die in Amol's arms, which she does. Amol is gravely disturbed and depressed. He pressures the topic of love to Shikha and Shruti and regrets leaving Shivani forty years ago.

Rahul, meanwhile, starts taking care of the recovering Neha and they form a special bond. One day, Rahul takes her to the outskirts of the city to an unfinished house. Rahul explains to Neha that his father's dream was to build a good house or a restaurant, and he had invested everything into this house. But he didn't have enough money to complete the ceiling and a few parts of the house. Now, Rahul is determined to fulfill his father's dream. This moves Neha.

Shruti manages to track down Neha in Rahul's house. Realizing that she has attempted suicide, Shruti misunderstands the situation and scolds Rahul and slaps him, which Neha watches with confusion. While calling for a cab outside the apartment, she sees Ranjit (who has returned) approaching Neha and inquiring her, which makes Shruti realize that Ranjit was having an affair with Neha and not Rahul and that Ranjit was the reason.

Meanwhile, Shikha visits Akash in his home, where they get physically close. Just before they get even more intimate, Shikha realizes her boundaries and leaves Akash's home. She comes home crying.

Ranjit, who has arrived at home, sees Shikha crying and misunderstands that Shruti has told about Ranjit's affair. Ranjit then confesses himself. After confessing, Shikha says that Shruti never told her anything and confesses her friendship and closeness with Akash.

Ranjit, enraged, decides to move in with Neha.

Monty announces his wedding date to Shruti, who has fallen for him.

Rahul, upset with the way the city has treated him, decides to leave Mumbai by train.

On the day of Monty's wedding, Rahul decides to leave, Ranjit decides to move in with Neha, and Akash sends Shikha her handbag which she left in Akash's house. He also sends her a letter that says that he is ready to accept her the way she is: a housewife, or as a modern girl. He also writes that he has been offered a job in Dubai and he is ready to leave for the airport by train and she must come with him.

While traveling with Ranjit, Neha realizes that she loves Rahul and starts chasing his taxi to the railway station. 
Shruti decides to convey her feelings to Monty and does right before he ties the knot. Monty gives a jibe, saying: 'What? You're too late. The size of the clothes won't match you!' Angry she leaves. Monty also realizes that he loves Shruti and chases her taxi to the same railway station on the wedding horse. Shikha dresses up and goes to the railway station.

In the railway station, Monty chases Shruti, Neha chases Rahul, and Shikha searches for Akash. While searching for Shruti, Monty bumps into Rahul, which causes Rahul's suitcase to break open. While putting back the clothes into his suitcase, Neha also arrives and romantically helps Rahul with his clothes, hinting that Rahul is not going to leave Mumbai.

Monty finally finds Shruti in a ladies compartment and enters it. They realize their love for each other and hug, causing all the ladies around to break into a huge applause.

Shikha finds Akash, but tells him that she is not going to come with him and wishes him the best for his job in Dubai and leaves.

The movie ends with Rahul and Neha eating dinner with the doctor and his wife from their neighborhood, Shikha and Ranjit in a happier marriage, Shruti and Monty, who have married, waiting in a traffic signal with their three-year-old child and Akash still roaming the streets of Mumbai.

Amol remembers Shivani and is seen sitting on the same bench in the railway station Shivani sat when he met her. In the station, he sees a young man crossing the tracks like Amol did and uniting with his girlfriend. This makes Amol smile and he moves on.

The movie ends with Pritam Chakraborty performing a song and a epilogical montage of the lives of the characters.

Cast
 Dharmendra as Amol, Shivani's childhood love interest
 Nafisa Ali as Shivani, Amol's childhood love interest, Shikha and Shruti's aunt
 Shilpa Shetty as Shikha Ghosh Kapoor, Ranjit's wife, Shruti's sister, Shivani's niece, Akash's love interest
 Kay Kay Menon as Ranjit Kapoor, Shikha's husband, Shruti's brother-in-law, Neha's boss/love interest, Rahul's boss
 Shiney Ahuja as Akash Sharma, Shikha's love interest
 Irrfan Khan as Monty, Shruti's love interest
 Konkona Sen Sharma as Shruti Ghosh, Shikha's sister, Ranjit's sister-in-law, Shivani's niece, Monty's love interest, Neha's roommate
 Kangana Ranaut as Neha Grewal, Shruti's roommate, Ranjit's love interest, Rahul's crush
 Sharman Joshi as Rahul Dhupia, Ranjit's subordinate, Neha's colleague
 Ashwin Mushran as Abdullah Ansari, Shruti's Boss
 Manoj Pahwa as Dr. Pritam Ahuja, Rahul's neighbor
 Sumit as director
Pritam Chakraborty as Rock Band Leader (Guest Appearance)

Box office
Life in a... Metro was the 26th highest grossing Bollywood film of 2007, grossing . It became a semi-hit at the box office, despite taking a below average opening.

Soundtrack

The soundtrack was released on 14 March 2007. Life In A... Metro'''s music was composed by Pritam with lyrics by Sayeed Quadri, Amitabh Verma and Sandeep Srivastava. Bob Dylan's "I Want You" plays in the background when Shruti and Rishi are at a vending machine and Shruti mistakes Rishi to be gesturing and speaking with her. The song does not appear on the soundtrack. According to the Indian trade website Box Office India, with around 11,00,000 units sold, this film's soundtrack album was the year's twelfth highest-selling.

Production
The song "Alvida" was composed by Pritam back in 90's when he was still struggling.

Metro Band
Pritam formed the band Metro with Suhail Kaul and the Bangladeshi singer Fahruk Mahfuz Anam a.k.a. James that performed the songs in the movie.

In the film, this rock band led by Pritam plays at important junctures and takes the story forward. This is considered to be a first in Indian film. The music score in Life In A... Metro is heavily rock-oriented. The four-members were Pritam, Suhail Kaul, Soham Chakraborty and Bangladeshi singer James.

Track list

 Accolades 

Sequel 
Its sequel titled Metro... In Dino'' was announced in 2022 with Basu and Pritam returning as director and music composer.  

The sequel will star Aditya Roy Kapoor, Sara Ali Khan, Ali Fazal, Fatima Sana Sheikh, Pankaj Tripathi, Konkana Sen Sharma, Anupam Kher and Neena Gupta in lead roles.  

The film is set to release on 8 December 2023.

Notes

References

External links
 Life In A... Metro : UTV Motion Picture Official Website
 

2007 films
2000s Hindi-language films
Films set in Mumbai
Films about adultery in India
Films featuring songs by Pritam
UTV Motion Pictures films
Films directed by Anurag Basu